The Otaman 6x6 is an armoured fighting vehicle produced by the Ukrainian manufacturer NGO Practika and presented for the first time at the Indian Defexpo in 2016, followed by the Otaman 8x8 in the Arms and Security Exhibition held in Kyiv in 2017. This armoured fighting vehicle (AFV) can also be used as an armoured personnel carrier (APC), an infantry fighting vehicle (IFV), and as an ambulance.

Description

The Otaman 6x6 is based on the BTR-60 APC. It is powered by a single 320 hp engine and has a torque of 1250 N⋅m. It can carry three members of the crew (commander, driver and gunner) and ten army personnel. The 6x6 is mainly produced for the Ukrainian army, but is also exported. 

It is an agile APC, like the BTR-80 but with more firepower, because of the 122 mm howitzer that it has as the primary armament.

Armament

The Otaman 6x6 is armed with a Soviet 122 mm self-propelled 2A18 howitzer as the primary weapon. As the secondary weapon, it has a 30mm ZTM-1 (2A72) cannon with 400 rounds or a 14.5 mm heavy machine gun. The primary weapon can also be used as a remotely controlled gun.

Note

Armoured fighting vehicles of Ukraine
Armoured personnel carriers of Ukraine
Armoured personnel carriers of the post–Cold War period
Wheeled armoured fighting vehicles
Six-wheeled vehicles
Wheeled infantry fighting vehicles